Namahyoke Sockum Curtis (1861November 25, 1935) was an American nurse. She recruited 32 black nurses to serve with the US Army in the Spanish American War. The nurses were supposed to be immune to diseases common in Cuba, specifically yellow fever. Her husband was the superintendent of the Freedmen's Hospital. After the 1900 Galveston hurricane, she volunteered her services as a nurse.

After the 1906 San Francisco earthquake, Curtis served as a nurse on a commission from William Howard Taft.

Biography 
Born in 1861 to Acoma Pueblo Hamilton Sockum and Arena Jackson. Educated at San Francisco schools, graduated from Snell Seminary (Oakland, California) 1888. On May 5 of the same year, married Dr. Austin Maurice Curtis, and moved to Chicago. Played a large role in fundraising for and creating Provident Hospital. In 1898, they moved to Washington, D.C. During the Spanish American War, she was hired to recruit nurses, specifically immune to typhoid fever. Curtis succeeded in recruiting 32 such nurses, of whom at least two would later die due to typhoid fever. From that, she earned a pension, and government commendation. During both the Galveston hurricane and subsequent flood, and the later San Francisco earthquake, Curtis would play a role in helping nurse the wounded. Namah was recognized for her service with a high commendation, a lifelong government pension, and burial in Arlington National Cemetery.

References 

1861 births
1935 deaths
American nurses
American women nurses
Burials at Arlington National Cemetery
People from Acoma Pueblo